The 3rd Soccer Bowl the third and final edition of the Soccer Bowl, a soccer match to determine the college soccer champion prior to the arrival of the NCAA Division I Men's Soccer Tournament. The match featured the University of San Francisco Dons men's soccer program against Temple University Owls men's soccer program. After being played in St. Louis, Missouri for two years, the third Soccer Bowl was hosted by the University of San Francisco at Kezar Stadium.

Temple won the match 2–0 to claim their third national championship. Although Temple won the Soccer Bowl, the ISFA declared Franklin & Marshall as the national champions of the 1951 ISFA season. The American Soccer History Archives recognizes both titles as valid national championship claims.

References

External links 
 Temple Owls 1951 Team Article

Championship Game
1951
1952 in sports in California
San Francisco Dons men's soccer
Temple Owls men's soccer
January 1952 sports events in the United States